Agresta is a surname. Notable people with the surname include:

Agostino Agresta (c.1600–1617), Italian composer
Maria Agresta (born 1978), Italian operatic soprano. 
Renzo Agresta (born 1985), Brazilian fencer
Robert A. Agresta (born 1983), American politician